Galatheacaris abyssalis is a rare species of shrimp, now thought to be a larval stage of another genus, Eugonatonotus.

It was seen to be so different from previously known shrimp species that a new family, Galatheacarididae, and superfamily, Galatheacaridoidea, were erected for it. Later, more specimens were found in the stomach of a lancetfish, Alepisaurus ferox.

The species shares some plesiomorphies with Procaris, and the two taxa were thought to be closely related. Molecular phylogenetic analyses showed that Galatheacaris abyssalis had such similar mitochondrial DNA to that of Eugonatonotus chacei that the two must be considered conspecific; it is now thought that Galatheacaris is the megalopa stage of Eugonatonotus.

References

Caridea
Monotypic arthropod genera